Two Sergeants of General Custer is a 1965 Italian Spaghetti Western comedy film directed by Giorgio Simonelli starring the comic duo Franco and Ciccio.

Cast
 Franco Franchi as Franco La Pera
 Ciccio Ingrassia as Ciccio La Pera
 Margaret Lee as Beth Smith – The Lynx
 Moira Orfei as Baby O'Connor
 Fernando Sancho as Serg. Fidhouse
 Ernesto Calindri as Northern States Colonel
 Franco Giacobini as Cochise
 Nino Terzo as Schultz
 Aroldo Tieri as Specialista
 Riccardo Garrone as Specialista
 Michele Malaspina as General Lee
 Dina Loy as Mary
 Juan Luis Galiardo as Fidanzato di Mary (as Juan Luis Gallardo)
 Armando Curcio as Major Carter
 Alfio Caltabiano as Nervous Buffalo
 Ignazio Spalla as Northern Adjutant 
 Enzo Andronico as Lee's Colonel

Release
Two Sergeants of General Custer was released in 1965.

References

Footnotes

Sources

External links
 

1965 films
1965 comedy films
1960s Western (genre) comedy films
1960s buddy comedy films
Films directed by Giorgio Simonelli
Italian Western (genre) films
Italian buddy comedy films
Spaghetti Western films
Spanish comedy films
Western (genre) cavalry films
1960s Italian films